Edward Morell Holmes FLS (29 January 1843 – 10 September 1930) was a British botanist, curator and lecturer in materia medica. Most of the specimens he collected are marine algae, lichens, or bryophytes.

Early life and education
Holmes was educated at the Grammar School in Boston, Lincolnshire and the Grammar School in Wimborne Minster. At the age of 14 he was apprenticed to  Mr. S. S. Hayward, a pharmacist in Cheyne Walk, Chelsea, London. He studied pharmacy at the Pharmaceutical Society's school in Bloomsbury Square, walking from Chelsea to attend morning lectures. He passed the Minor examination to qualify as a Chemist and Druggist. He then worked for Mr T.Vicary in Plymouth, and while there collected a herbarium of British plants which won the Society's bronze medal in 1863. He passed the Society's Major examination to qualify as a Pharmaceutical Chemist in May 1864.

Career 
Holmes worked in London in 1863 and 1864, first as assistant successively to Alsop & Quiller, Sloane Square, and then Mr. G. Tarde, Lamb's Conduit Street. He then returned to Plymouth, and, after a short time with his earlier employer Mr. Vicary, he started his own business at 2 Arundel Crescent. After six years, he sold the business and came to work for Wright, Seller & Layman in London, as head of their perfumery department. However, after three months  he left to become Curator of the Pharmaceutical Society's Museum in November 1872. He remained in the post for 50 years until his retirement in 1922, after which he was styled emeritus curator until his death in 1930.  He systematised the museum and compiled a catalogue of it which was published in 1878, and later compiled a catalogue of the Hanbury Herbarium. From 1873 to 1876 he was a lecturer on botany at Westminster Hospital Medical School. From 1887 to 1890 he was a lecturer on materia medica at the Pharmaceutical Society.  He published more than 300 articles on drugs and medicinal plants.

Honours 
He was a Fellow of the Linnean Society. He was awarded the Fluckiger Medal in 1897 and the Pharmaceutical Society's Hanbury Gold Medal in 1915, both in recognition of his contribution to the field. He was President of the British Pharmaceutical Conference in 1900.

Personal life 
In 1882 he married Catherine "Kate" Appleford (b. 1842), who also collected British plants. In 1921 an automobile hit him, necessitating the amputation of part of one leg.   In 1935 she donated his papers to the Wellcome Library. There were no children from the marriage.

References

External links
 

1843 births
1930 deaths
19th-century British botanists
20th-century British botanists
Botanists with author abbreviations
British phycologists
English curators
Fellows of the Linnean Society of London